Highland View Academy is a private co-educational secondary boarding school located in Hagerstown, Maryland, United States, and run by the Seventh-day Adventist Church. It is a part of the Seventh-day Adventist education system, the world's second largest Christian school system. It is accredited by the Middle States Association of Colleges and Schools

History

Mount Aetna Academy was established in 1949 as a day school. It offered education for grades 1-12. That first year there were 50 students enrolled in Grades 1-8 and 30 students enrolled in Grades 9-12.

It was located at the present Mount Aetna Adventist Elementary School on Crystal Falls Drive.
 

At a May, 1965, constituency meeting, the Chesapeake Conference of Seventh-day Adventists voted to build a fully accredited secondary boarding school. On October 9, 1966, ground was broken for the first two buildings, Janel Kay DeHaan Hall and Hartle Hall. The Dehaan and Hartle families participated in this event.  The boarding phase of the school opened in the fall of 1967 with one hundred students enrolled. Two new dormitories had been constructed. The school continued to use the facilities of the former Mount Aetna Academy while the new campus was being completed. In 1975, the administration building , was opened. Four years later the gymnasium was built as a separate building.

The cafeteria-music building was added in 1986 and named E & I Barr Hall in 1993. In 1991 a library wing was added to the administration building which housed several classrooms and a computer lab. The Highland View Academy Church (Now Highland View Church) members moved into a new sanctuary on campus in 1993.

Sports
Highland View Academy's athletic teams, known as the Tartans, compete in basketball, soccer, and volleyball. In addition, there is a non-competitive sports acrobatics team, the HVA Aerials. The HVA Aerials focus is promoting a Christian lifestyle through acrobatics and gymnastics, healthy living, positive teamwork, and smart life choices.

Curriculum
The schools curriculum consists primarily of the standard courses taught at college preparatory schools across the world. All students are required to take classes in the core areas of English, Basic Sciences, Mathematics, a Foreign Language, and Social Sciences, and most of these classes have Honors or AP variants. There are elective arts classes in Handbells, Band, Choir, Drama, and Drawing. There is also a STEM program, in which students take extra science and math classes.

Spiritual aspects
All students take religion classes each year that they are enrolled. These classes cover topics in biblical history and Christian and denominational doctrines. Instructors in other disciplines also begin each class period with prayer or a short devotional thought, many which encourage student input. Daily, students gather in the auditorium for Prayer & Praise, a 20 minute time slot for singing and praying. Weekly, the entire student body gathers together in the auditorium for an hour-long chapel service. Outside the classrooms there is year-round spiritually oriented programming that relies on student involvement.

See also

 List of Seventh-day Adventist secondary schools
 Seventh-day Adventist education

References

External links

Boarding schools in Maryland
Christianity in Hagerstown, Maryland
Educational institutions established in 1949
Schools in Hagerstown, Maryland
Private high schools in Maryland
Adventist secondary schools in the United States
1949 establishments in Maryland